Guillaume Viole (died 1568) was a French Catholic bishop. He was the Bishop of Paris from 1564 to 1568.

In 1564, Charles IX of France named Guillaume Viole Bishop of Paris to replace Eustache du Bellay who resigned in 1563. He was consecrated as a bishop on March 18, 1565. He died on May 4, 1568 and was burried in the choir of Notre-Dame de Paris.

References
Profile from http://www.catholic-hierarchy.org

1568 deaths
Bishops of Paris
Year of birth unknown
Burials at Notre-Dame de Paris